Nevada High School is a public high school located in Nevada, Missouri. It serves students in grades 9 through 12 and is the only high school in the Nevada R-V School District.

History
The school held its first graduation ceremony in 1881.

Academics
NHS offers Advanced Placement classes; about one-tenth of the student body partakes in an AP class.

Athletics
Nevada's athletic teams are nicknamed the Tigers and compete in the Big 8 Conference.

Performing arts
NHS fields three competitive show choirs, the mixed-gender "Soundsational Singers" and "Vocal Fusion" as well as the all-female "Treble Effects". Since 1990, the program has also hosted an annual competition.

Notable alumni
 Ed Emery, politician
 Brett Merriman, professional baseball player
 Bill Phelps, politician

References

Public high schools in Missouri
Buildings and structures in Vernon County, Missouri